Heimansia is a genus of green algae, specifically of the Desmidiaceae.

The genus name of Heimansia is in honour of Jacobus Heimans (1889-1978), who was a Dutch botanist (Bryology and Algology) and was Curator of the Herbarium at the University of Amsterdam.

The genus was circumscribed by Peter F. M. Coesel in Crypt. Algol. vol.14 on page 107 in 1993.

References

External links

Scientific references

Scientific databases

 
 AlgaTerra database
 Index Nominum Genericorum

Desmidiaceae
Charophyta genera